Liu Guanchu is a Chinese chess International Master.

Chess career
He played in the Chess World Cup 2017, being defeated by Shakhriyar Mamedyarov in the first round.

References

External links 

Liu Guanchu chess games at 365Chess.com

1994 births
Living people
Chinese chess players